was an early-Edo period Japanese samurai, and the 2nd daimyō  of Kaga Domain in the Hokuriku region of Japan, and the 3rd hereditary chieftain of the Maeda clan. Toshitsune was a brother of Maeda Toshinaga and a son of Maeda Toshiie. He was the wealthiest daimyō within the Tokugawa shogunate, and his domain encompassed Etchū, Kaga, and Noto provinces. His childhood name was Saruchiyo (猿千代) later "Inuchiyo" (犬千代).

Toshitsune was the fourth son of Maeda Toshiie, and was born to a concubine when Toshiie was aged 54 and was on campaign with Toyotomi Hideyoshi at Nagoya Castle during the Japanese invasion of Korea. He was largely raised by a retainer, Maeda Nagatane and was initially called Toshimitsu (利光). In 1600 he married Tama-hime, a daughter of Tokugawa Hidetada in a political marriage intended to secure the position of the Maeda clan with the growing power of the Tokugawa. In 1605, his elder brother Maeda Toshinaga officially retired, and appointed Toshitsune as his heir and daimyō of Kaga Domain; however, Toshinaga continued to control the domain until his death. In 1614 and 1615, Toshitsune led the Maeda army at the Siege of Osaka, forming one of the largest components of the Tokugawa forces. After the final defeat of the Toyotomi clan, Tokugawa Ieyasu offered the Maeda clan the four provinces of Shikoku island in exchange for their existing three provinces in the Hokuriku region, but Toshitsune declined.

In 1616, Toshitsune met with a diplomatic mission from Ayutthaya in Kanazawa, which due to the death of Tokugawa Ieyasu was not allowed to continue on to Edo.

He changed his name to Toshitsune in 1629. As Toshitsune, daimyō Toshitsune worked to allay fears by the Tokugawa shogunate of Kaga Domain's size and economic strength. He kept his son and heir Maeda Mitsutaka in Edo has a potential hostage, and arranged a political marriage of his son to a daughter of Tokugawa Yorinobu of Mito Domain. He retired in 1639, relocating to Komatsu and ordered that the domain be divided, with 100,000 koku going to his younger son Maeda Toshitsugu to form Toyama Domain, 70,000 koku going go his third son, Maeda Toshiharu to form Daishōji Domain, and 200,000 koku to support his own retirement. He died in 1658 at the age of 64, and his grave is at the Maeda cemetery at Nodayama in Kanazawa.

Family
Father: Maeda Toshiie (1539–1599)
Mother: Kinsein
Adoptive father: Maeda Toshinaga
Wife: Tokugawa Tamahime (1599–1622), daughter of Tokugawa Hidetada and Azai Oeyo
 First daughter: Kametsuruhime (1613-1630) married Mori Tadahiro
 First son: Maeda Mitsutaka (1616-1645)
 Second daughter: Kohime (1616-1617)
 Second son: Maeda Toshitsugu (1617–1674)
 Third son: Maeda Toshiharu (1618–1660)
 Third daughter: Manhime (1620-1700) married Asano Mitsuakira
 Fourth daughter: Fuhime (1621-1662) married Prince Hachijō Toshitada
 Fifth daughter: Natsuhime (1622-1623)
Concubine: Okowa no Kata
 Sixth daughter: Haruhime (1631-1650) married Honda Masanaga
Concubine: Okuri no Kata, Chō Tsuratatsu's daughter
 Fifth son: Maeda Toshiaki (1638-1692)
Concubine: Gojo-no-Tsubone
 Seventh daughter: Matsuhime (1648-1666) married Matsudaira Sadashige
 Eighth daughter: Ryuhime (1650-1654)
Concubine: Kyogoku no kata
 Seventh son: Ryumaru (1648-1651)
Concubine: Fukusho-in
 Ninth daughter: Kumahime (1652-1715) married Hoshina Masatsune

References 
Papinot, Edmond. (1948). Historical and Geographical Dictionary of Japan. New York: Overbeck Co.

External links
Kaga Domain on "Edo 300 HTML" (3 November 2007) 

1594 births
1658 deaths
Maeda clan
Tozama daimyo
People of Edo-period Japan
Deified Japanese people